Vintage: Duke Ellington Song Book is a jazz duo album by the pianist Toshiko Akiyoshi and the tenor saxophonist / flutist Lew Tabackin. It was released on June 18, 2008 by T-toc Records.

Track listing
 "Take the 'A' Train" (Strayhorn) – 5:04
 "Sophisticated Lady" (Ellington, Mills, Parish) – 3:52
 "Gypsy Without a Song" (Ellington) – 5:43
 "Mood Indigo" (Ellington, Bigard, Mills) – 5:31
 "Serenade to Sweden" (Ellington) – 4:49
 "All Too Soon" (Ellington, Sigman) – 5:59
 "It Don't Mean a Thing" (Ellington, Mills) – 4:20
 "I Got It Bad (and That Ain't Good)" (Ellington, Webster) – 5:03
 "Drop Me Off in Harlem" (Ellington, Kenny) – 5:35
 "Eulogy" (Akiyoshi) – 5:46
 "What Am I Here For?" (Ellington, Laine) – 4:22
 "Cotton Tail" (Ellington, Hendricks) – 3:18
 "In a Sentimental Mood" (Ellington, Kurtz) – 2:17

Source:

Personnel
Toshiko Akiyoshi – piano 
Lew Tabackin – tenor saxophone, flute

References

Toshiko Akiyoshi albums
Lew Tabackin albums
2008 albums
Collaborative albums